Karla Eslinger is a member of the Missouri Senate representing the 33rd Missouri Senatorial District since 2021, and her term ends in 2025. She succeeded fellow Republican Mike Cunningham. Eslinger previously served in the Missouri House of Representatives for one term.

Personal life 
Eslinger lives in Wasola, Missouri. She graduated Gainesville High School, and she got a master's degree in education administration at the Missouri State University.

Electoral history

State House of Representatives

State Senate

References

21st-century American politicians
21st-century American women politicians
Living people
Republican Party members of the Missouri House of Representatives
Republican Party Missouri state senators
Missouri State University alumni
Place of birth missing (living people)
Women state legislators in Missouri
Year of birth missing (living people)